The Buonarotti Club was a bohemian artists’ society named after Michaelangelo that was active in Melbourne, Australia between 1883 and 1887 and was associated with Heidelberg School of painters of the period.

Foundation 

The Buonarotti Club was established in May 1883 at the Prince's Bridge Hotel (Young and Jackson's), on the corner of Swanston and Flinders Streets, in Melbourne by Cyrus Mason, secretary of the charitable Victorian Art Unions 1872–75, engraver, draughtsman and artist who was publishing, views and maps in coloured lithographs from mid-century, The Club flourished for the next four years before disbanding in September 1887.

Through his membership of Melbourne's Yorick Club, Mason was active in colonial literary, artistic and bohemian circles, and in the 1860s, was an illustrator for his friend Marcus Clarke, editor of the Colonial Monthly.  He proposed the name 'Buonarotti' in honour of Italian sculptor, painter, draughtsman and architect Michelangelo di Lodovico Buonarroti Simoni (1475-1564), in accord with a widespread revival of interest in Michelangelo then in Europe and Britain, though using a slightly different spelling of the surname than is currently accepted. The Renaissance hero also excelled in a number of artistic media and was thus an appropriate figurehead for a club with multidisciplinary membership, with one, Brian Gilks, regarding him as their ‘patron saint.’

That the club's inaugural meeting was at Young and Jackson Hotel linked it to Melbourne art patronage through one of its owners, the art collector Henry Figsby Young (1845-1925) who decorated the hotel with nineteenth-century European and Australian paintings and displayed a selection of 'South Sea island weaponry' on the walls, making it an exciting and simulating venue for aspiring bohemian artists and associates.

After the club's early meetings at Young and Jackson's, the group continued at the Earl of Zetland also in Swanston Street, Sheehan's New Treasury Club Hotel on Spring Street, the Duke of Rothsay in Elizabeth Street and the newly established Melbourne Coffee Palace, Bourke Street.

Founders Mason and his colleague Edward Gilks (c.1882-c.1900), were senior engravers and the professional painters joining them in the inaugural meeting in May 1883, included Fred M. Williams, Tom Humphrey, John Longstaff and Alexander Colquhoun, and also younger artists, the art teachers, John L. Himen, Theodore Dewey and Izett Watson.

Identity and activity 
While other art societies were established around this time, including the Victorian Academy of Arts (1870-1888), the Australian Artists Society (formed in 1886) and the Victorian Artists Society (1888), their purpose was the study and exhibition of art, while the Buonarotti Club was a unique entity.  Club members joined one of three 'sections';'Artistic', 'Literary' and 'Musical', though most of its men and women were professional painters, including Frederick McCubbin, Louis Abrahams, Tom Roberts and Jane Sutherland.

It differed from the several other literary clubs and societies of Melbourne's 1880s, the Shakespeare Society, the Shelley Society, the Burns Society and the Lamb Society, in that it was artist-dominated, with members with professional goals, rather than amateurs, though it included emerging painters who came for critique and instruction from their peers, and opportunities to exhibit and to be received by Melbourne art world. Music and literature provided further topics for discussion.

The character and reputation of its founding members established the club as being devoted to artistic development; experienced professionals providing guidance to the aspiring artist-teachers. A 1936 Adelaide News article notes that L. T. Luxton's Memories of Noted Artistsconveys the startling information that Sir John Longstaff in those days (the 'eighties) was a most brilliant performer on the piano and used to entertain the members regularly with recitals of a high classic order. This is news, for few of us were aware that he was a practitioner. What is even more startling is the statement that in the days before boxing became so popular with the respectable advent of gloves Sir John was noted for his prowess with the bare knuckles, and in many an encounter with the local lads on the banks of the Goulburn at Shepparton (Vic.) he more than held his own.The Luxton article further adds David Davies and E. Phillips Fox to its list of members

The Club enjoyed the patronage of a sophisticated following of art lovers and collectors through a quarterly conversazione (called sometimes 'The Ladies' Nights'), which took place in the prestigious Melbourne Coffee Palace. The programmes issued show that musical members sang or played (Mason himself was earlier the publisher of an original score The Song of the Bush) while the Artistic Section exhibited new work. Guests partook of supper at one shilling per head and mingled with the members, who were identified by a maroon ribbon on their lapel and showed guests 'large numbers of paintings in oils and watercolours, portfolios of sketches and specimens of wood engraving’. These evenings followed on a smaller scale the lead of London's Grosvenor Gallery which in the 1870s had attract art audiences to Grand Opening banquets, 'invitationals', Sunday openings, private views, at-homes and soirées.

Similarly, the name of the Buonarotti Club is evidence of the group's imitation of the European revival of interest in Michelangelo. With reference to the old master's study of the human body and its movement, as discussed by Cyrus Mason in a Club lecture, life classes were conducted by the club.  Member Alice Brotherton wrote and delivered poems in 1884 to celebrate the 400th anniversary of Michelangelo's birth and his devotion to ‘art for art’s sake’, and devised the club's motto attributed to Michelangelo, Puolidie Addisco ('Still I learn’), while Rodney Cherry in 1885 lectured on a biography of the artist. Lecture topics ranged across discussion of the relative merits of professional and amateur art, the portrait, ‘Art in Education’ and beauty in art. Other members, including Mason presented progress on a personal project, or on other artists and intellectuals, with presentations about Oliver Goldsmith (also by Mason), Ralph Waldo Emerson (by Tudor St. George Tucker) and Professor William Denton (Henry B. Blanche). Alexander Colquhoun, in satyrical verse, urged the Victorian National Gallery to hang French painter Jules Lefebvre's controversial 1875 nude Chloé loaned to it by its purchaser Dr Thomas Fitzgerald. The Club discussed the desirability of duty being charged on imported artworks. Tom Roberts promoted the role of professional artists in providing feedback to members on their work and in selection of works for exhibition.

The Buonarotti Club and the Heidelberg School 

Mead emphasises the priority of interests within the Buonarotti Club before they emerged in the Heidelberg School in that the Club encouraged its members to paint en plein air and established artists’ camps prior to Tom Roberts, Frederick McCubbin and Louis Abrahams (associates of the club) conducted such a camp at Houston's farm, near the present-day Melbourne suburb of Box Hill in 1885. He cites April 1884 when Club Secretary Rodney Cherry wrote to the Secretary for Railways requesting travel at reduced rates.

Buonarotti Club artists who would later become members of the so-called Heidelberg School, exhibited plein air works and were subject to the influence of their peers in the club. McCubbin joined in 1883; Abrahams in 1884 and Roberts attended as a guest in June, September and November 1885, and was elected a member in January 1886. Members painting landscape in the open air included Fred Williams (1883-1884); Tudor St. George Tucker, 1884 and 1885;  Walter Withers 1884; and Tom Humphrey late-1886 and early 1887. Buonarotti Club members camped and painted at Eaglemont contemporaneously with the early Heidelberg School period (1883-1887) and also at Koo-Wee-Rup Swamp, setting out from Mason's Tynong estate.

McCubbin, during his years of membership in the Buonarotti Club and his chairing of its art committee in 1884, and as Mead notes, painted Home Again (1884), Lost and Winter Evening, Hawthorn in 1886 and Moynes Bay, Beaumaris in 1887, and in the Melbourne suburb of Studley Park painted The Letter (1884), Picnic at Studley Park (1885), followed in 1886 by The Yarra, Studley Park, Two Sisters on a Rocky Hillside and Sunset Glow. Tom Roberts, also prolific while in the club, produced A Quiet Day on Darebin Creek in 1885, and in the next year The Artists' Camp, Coming South, Wood Splitters and A Summer Morning Tiff, then The Sunny South and Mentone in 1887. In the final year of the Buonarotti Club, Jane Sutherland painted Obstruction, Box Hill (1887). All are major works in the respective artists' careers.

Member Alexander Colquhoun later contributed significantly to research into the early history of Australian art, and the Heidelberg School in early monographs on McCubbin (1919) and  Walter Withers (1920).

Women artists 

While the Club members were identified as adopting a bohemian persona and a devotion to Aestheticism, particularly the dandy Tudor St. George Tucker, and expressed an often extrovert and eccentric artistic fraternity and sense of humour, a more lasting and constructive impact was its promotion of women artists.

Humphrey McQueen notes Jane Sutherland's chairing of its meetings, and Mary Eagle concurs that the Club played an important role in Sutherland's career at a period when she needed professional stimulation, describing the club as a 'place where art and intellectual ideas were debated without fear or favour’.

Alice Chapman, Isobel (Iso) Rae, Clara Southern and May Vale, gained similar opportunities as Sutherland. While Clara Southern is usually described as 'among the first women to be elected to the Buonarotti Society in 1886' in fact while she did join in that year, several other female artists were already members and it was Alice Brotherton, sister of Winnie Brotherton who was the first woman elected to the Club in 1883 (and who married Rodney Cherry), followed by Sutherland and Vale, who both joined in 1884.

Others who were active Buonarotti members who all joined in 1886 included the sculptor Margaret Baskerville, A.E. 'Lizzie' Oakley, and watercolourist Elizabeth Parsons. All were talented aspiring female artists active in the club's professional artistic environment and welcomed as equals by their male counterparts.

Demise 
The Buonarotti Club wound up in late 1887, though a former member the watercolourist Elizabeth Parsons founded 'Stray Leaves', with several other ex-Buonarotti members. Composer and member Louis Lavater regarded the lack of leadership by the Artistic Section as responsible for its demise after the loss of stalwarts such as Longstaff, Julian Gibbs, and Cyrus Mason himself. The final Minutes contain a 'Farewell' at the Coffee Palace on 23 August 1887, to John Longstaff who sailed to London. Over 30 attended, including Cyrus Mason, Elizabeth Parsons, Alice Brotherton, Jane Sutherland, McCubbin, Lavater, Abrahams, Humphrey, J. Llewellyn Jones, Altson and guest Arthur Streeton. The Australasian reported; The Buonarotti-an artistic, literary, and musical club-held its monthly meeting on Wednesday evening at the Melbourne Coffee Palace. The attendance was large owing to the circumstance that before another meeting will take place Mr. Longstaff, an old comrade in the artistic section of the Buonarotti, will be on his voyage to Europe. The president, Mr. Cyrus Mason, referred to the many happy meetings held since 1883, when the club was founded, at which Mr. Longstaff had assisted, and said that he was the fifth comrade who had proceeded to Europe for the purposes of study. The president reminded the comrades that though the club was not a mutual admiration society, but founded for work and searching criticism, he felt justified in assuring Mr. Longstaff of tbe comrades' admiration of his work which had gained the National Gallery medal. Amongst other good music a song was well rendered by Miss Ridley. 'The words, by Miss Brotherton, spoke the farewell of the club to Mr. Longstaff, and the masic was by Mr. L. Lavater.

Members and associates

References 

Australian artist groups and collectives
Australian art
1883 establishments in Australia
1887 disestablishments in Australia
1883 in art
1887 in art